Brawby is a village and civil parish in the Ryedale district of North Yorkshire, England, situated at the confluence of the River Seven and the River Rye. According to the 2001 census Brawby had a population of 164, decreasing to 140 at the 2011 Census.

Geography

Entertainment
The Shed, a live music venue, offers both live music and performance art and attracts artists from all over the world. It was founded in 1992 by Simon Thackray.

References

External links

 History of Brawby
 Brawby Grange

Villages in North Yorkshire
Civil parishes in North Yorkshire
Ryedale